The 1914 American Grand Prize, held on February 28, 1914, was the third race of the 1914 Grand Prix season. It was held at the Santa Monica Road Course in Santa Monica, California. The Vanderbilt Cup, another Grand Prix race, was held on the same track two days earlier. The Mercer of Eddie Pullen won by almost 40 minutes over the Marmon of Guy Ball.

Classification

References

American Grand Prize, 1914
United States Grand Prix
American Grand Prize
History of Santa Monica, California
American Grand Prize